Muhammad Kwassau was the last independent ruler of Zazzau prior to its incorporation into the British Empire. After attaining rule in 1897 by being elected, though under threat of armed conflict, he welcomed the British in 1900, and invited them more fully in 1901 to fight Kontagora raids,  However, he was deposed by them in 1902, marking the end of Zazzau's independence.

See also
 Marok Gandu

References

Year of birth missing
Year of death missing
Place of birth missing
African kings
Nigerian traditional rulers
People from colonial Nigeria
19th-century Nigerian people
19th-century monarchs in Africa
Emirs of Zazzau
20th-century deaths
19th-century births